Western Addiction is an American punk rock band based in San Francisco, California, United States. The band was formed by four veterans of the punk scene. Some of the members previously worked for Fat Wreck Chords. They have toured internationally in both the USA, Europe, and Japan.

Members
Jason Hall - Vocals
Ken Yamazaki - Guitar
Tony Teixeira - Guitar
Mitch Paglia - Bass
Chad Williams - Drums

Past members
Sam Johnson - Bass/Vocals
Tyson "Chicken" Annicharico - Bass/Vocals

Discography

Albums
Cognicide (2005)
Tremulous (2017)
Frail Bray (2020)

EPs & 7"s
New Mexican Disaster Squad/Western Addiction Split (2004)
Remember to Dismember (2003)
Pines (2013)
I'm Not the Man That I Thought I'd Be (2015)

Trivia
Ken Yamazaki played in Enemy You, and also in Dead to Me with bandmate, Chicken.
Chicken plays in Dead to Me and was nominated as 'Sexiest Vegetarian' by PETA in 2006.
Chad Williams plays in Complaints and formerly Radio Reelers.
Sam Johnson played in Dead to Me, No Friends, VRGNS and New Mexican Disaster Squad.
Tony Teixeira currently plays bass with Swingin' Utters.

External links
Current label of Western Addiction.
Sound Scene Revolution: Interview with Western Addiction (Podcast)

Hardcore punk groups from California
Fat Wreck Chords artists